Motupipi is a settlement in the Tasman District of New Zealand's upper South Island, located at the mouth of the Motupipi River east of Tākaka.

The name Motupipi translates as the island or bush (motu) with pipi shellfish, referring to the pipi which are found on the beach.

History

European settlement

Europeans first surveyed the area in 1842 and began settling it in 1850. The settlement began as about 1500 acres of small dairy, fruit and hop farms.

There are records of several notable early settlers:

 Peter Packer and his parents were among the original settlers. He took over 150 acres in 1872, and was clearing, sowing and farming most of it by 1905.
 Reuben Packard, who moved to the area with his parents a few years later, also took up 150 acres, which he cleared for sheep and beef farming.
 Joseph Packard was born in Suffolk, England in 1826 and was the oldest early settler. He originally purchased a 50-acre block, before taking a 300-acre block which he used to graze a few cows and sheep and plant about 300 lemon trees.
 Thomas Harwood, who was born at sea to parents from Yeovil in Somersetshire, England, purchased 235 acres of forested limestone land in 1868, which he began clearing and farming 1876. He initially farmed cattle, but transitioned by sheep farming in the early 20th century. By 1905, he had cleared and cultivated about 130 acres of the property. Harwood was also an active local politician.

The Golden Bay Coal Company began mining for coal at Motupipi in the early 20th century.

Education

The school was established during the 1850s, making it one of the oldest schools in the Tasman District. By 1905, the school was a one-roomed building with a roll of 60 students and capacity for 10 more.

References

Populated places in the Tasman District